The 59th Texas Legislature met from January 12, 1965, to May 31, 1965, and again in a special called session from February 14, 1966, to February 23, 1966. All members present during this session were elected in the 1964 general elections.

Sessions
Regular session: January 12, 1965 – May 31, 1965
Called session: February 14, 1966 – February 23, 1966

Party summary

Senate

House

Officers

Senate
 Lieutenant Governor: Preston Smith (D)
 President Pro Tempore (regular session): Thomas W. Creighton (D)
 President Pro Tempore (called session): A. R. Schwartz (D)

House
 Speaker of the House: Ben Barnes (D)

Members

Senate

Dist. 1
 A. M. Aikin Jr. (D), Paris

Dist. 2
 Jack Strong (D), Longview

Dist. 3
 Martin Dies Jr. (D), Lufkin

Dist. 4
 D. Roy Harrington (D), Port Arthur

Dist. 5
 Neveille Colson (D), Navasota

Dist. 6
 Criss Cole (D), Houston

Dist. 7
 Galloway Calhoun (D), Tyler

Dist. 8
 George Parkhouse (D), Dallas

Dist. 9
 Ralph Hall (D), Rockwall

Dist. 10
 Don Kennard (D), Fort Worth

Dist. 11
 William T. "Bill" Moore (D), Bryan

Dist. 12
 J. P. Word (D), Meridian

Dist. 13
 Murray Watson Jr. (D), Waco

Dist. 14
 Charles F. Herring (D), Austin

Dist. 15
 Culp Krueger (D), El Campo

Dist. 16
 Louis Crump (D), San Saba

Dist. 17
 A. R. Schwartz (D), Galveston

Dist. 18
 Bill Patman (D), Ganado

Dist. 19
 Walter Richter (D), Gonzales

Dist. 20
 Bruce Reagan (D), Corpus Christi

Dist. 21
 Abraham Kazen (D), Laredo

Dist. 22
 Tom Creighton (D), Mineral Wells

Dist. 23
 Jack Hightower (D), Vernon

Dist. 24
 David Ratliff (D), Stamford

Dist. 25
 Dorsey B. Hardeman (D), San Angelo

Dist. 26
 Franklin Spears (D), San Antonio

Dist. 27
 James Bates (D), Edinburg

Dist. 28
 H. J. Blanchard (D), Lubbock

Dist. 29
 W. E. Snelson (D), Midland

Dist. 30
 Andrew J. Rogers (D), Childress

Dist. 31
 Grady Hazlewood (D), Amarillo

House

External links

59th Texas Legislature
1965 in Texas
Legislature
1966 in Texas
1965 U.S. legislative sessions
1966 U.S. legislative sessions